Paul Neilan is an American novelist. He is author of the book Apathy and Other Small Victories.

Apathy follows Shane, a directionless and hopelessly apathetic man in his mid-twenties, and has been compared to Benjamin Kunkel's Indecision, possibly part of a trend of novels focusing on directionless people of an unusually young age for such restlessness. The book was described by Max Barry as being the “funniest book he'd ever read,”' and a review in Daily Kos characterized it as "magnificent, one-of-kind, immensely interesting, a five star must-read, and hilarious", but a review in Booklist characterized it as "Juvenile fun for undiscerning lads with two hours to kill."

Neilan has three brother: John, Michael, and Ryan. He is the second oldest, followed by Michael and then Ryan. 
He has 3 nieces and a nephew. Lily Neilan, Lucy Neilan, Avery Neilan, and Quinn Neilan. 
He lives in New Jersey.

References
Barry, Max (Blog). "You Need This Book". Max
Barry, John. "No Future?". Baltimore City Paper Online
Review of Apathy and Other Small Victories by user "downtownLALife", Daily Kos, 9 Jan 2013
Frank Sennett, review of Apathy and Other Small Victories, Booklist, 15 May 2006

External links
Paul Neilan's Blog
Powell's Books Q&A - Paul Neilan

21st-century American novelists
American male novelists
Living people
Year of birth missing (living people)
21st-century American male writers